Taraya is a village  in the Baalbek District of the Baalbek-Hermel Governorate in Lebanon.

History
In 1838, Eli Smith noted Taraya's population as being predominantly  Metawileh.

References

Bibliography

 

Populated places in Baalbek District
Shia Muslim communities in Lebanon